7 Days of Funk was an American funk duo from Long Beach, California, composed of rapper Snoopzilla—known professionally as Snoop Dogg—and modern-funk musician Dâm-Funk. The self-titled debut studio album was released on December 10, 2013, by Stones Throw Records.

Discography

Studio albums
 7 Days of Funk (2013)

References

Snoop Dogg
Musical groups from Los Angeles
Rappers from Los Angeles
Musical groups established in 2013
American musical duos
African-American musical groups
American hip hop groups
Stones Throw Records artists
G-funk groups
2013 establishments in California